HMAS Torrens (DE 53) was a  of the Royal Australian Navy (RAN). Torrens entered service in 1971, and was active until her decommissioning in 1998.

Images and footage of the ship sinking have been used and adapted for various purposes, including in movies and as propaganda.

Construction
Although intended to be the same as the previous River class ships (themselves based on the British Type 12 frigate), the design was changed from 1965 to incorporate many of the improvements of the British s. Work on the two vessels started without specifications or a contract, and the evolving design meant changes were being made as the ships were being constructed, with resulting delays and cost increases attributed to a lack of planning.

Torrens was laid down by the Cockatoo Docks and Engineering Company Propriety Limited at Sydney, New South Wales on 18 August 1965. She was launched on 28 September 1968 by Dame Zara Holt, and commissioned into the RAN on 18 January 1971.

Operational history
Torrens and the destroyer tender  participated in celebrations of Papua New Guinea's independence from Australia in September 1975, with Torrens arriving in Rabaul on 14 September.

On 16 August 1976, Torrens and HMAS Melbourne were performing work-up exercises following the latter's refit when they were called to assist MV Miss Chief off the coast of Bundaberg, Queensland.

During late February and early March 1972, Torrens escorted the troopship  on her twenty-fourth and final troop transport voyage in support of the Vietnam War. The ships arrived in Vũng Tàu on 28 February, collected 457 Australian soldiers, then departed the next day for home.

Decommissioning and fate

HMAS Torrens paid off in 1998. On 14 June 1999, Torrens was sunk by a live Mark 48 Mod 4 torpedo fired by the   during the latter's combat system trials.

Digitally edited film of the torpedo hitting Torrens was used in the 2001 film Pearl Harbor as part of a black-and-white 'newsreel' montage. A photo of Torrens exploding was used on a Hezbollah-operated website to support a propaganda claim that an Israeli warship was sunk by a Hezbollah missile in July 2006.

Her 4.5-inch Mk V/Mk 6 gun turret is preserved at Princess Royal Fortress, Albany, Western Australia.

Citations

References
Books
 
 
 
 
 
 
 

News articles and websites
 
 
 

River-class destroyer escorts
Shipwrecks of Western Australia
Ships sunk as targets
1968 ships